The 1995–96 Ottawa Senators season was the fourth season of the Ottawa Senators of the National Hockey League (NHL). This season was plenty of change for the club. The club changed coaching staffs twice, changed their general manager and moved into the new Palladium arena in Kanata. The team again finished last in the league, even though they knocked the defending Stanley Cup champion New Jersey Devils out of playoff contention in the last game of the season, allowing the Tampa Bay Lightning to clinch the playoff berth at the expense of the Devils.

Offseason

Prior to the season, on August 2, 1995, Brian Smith, former NHL hockey player and sportscaster at Ottawa TV station CJOH-TV was killed. He had been the primary reporter on the Senators for the station. The Senators honored him with a patch on their jerseys, with his nickname 'Smitty' and number 18, which they wore on their jerseys for the whole season. The team raised a banner in his memory.

Regular season

The Senators finished last in wins (18), points (41), goals scored (191), even-strength goals scored (132), power-play goals scored (53) and power-play percentage (12.33%). They also tied the New York Rangers and the Tampa Bay Lightning for fewest short-handed goals scored (6).

There were some bright spots during the season, rookie Daniel Alfredsson led the team offensively with 61 points (26 goals-35 assists), while Alexei Yashin was out of the lineup for 36 games. Alfredsson won the Calder Memorial Trophy, awarded to the NHL's rookie of the year.

After getting off to a good start with a 6–5–0 record, the Senators lost their next eight games, which ended up costing head coach Rick Bowness his job, as the club replaced him with Dave Allison, who was previously the head coach of the Senators AHL affiliate, the Prince Edward Island Senators. The Dave Allison era did not last long in Ottawa, as the club won two of 25 games (2–22–1) before he was replaced by Jacques Martin. Under Martin, the Senators was more competitive, going 10–24–4 in his 38 games to finish the year with an 18–59–5, their fourth straight season at the bottom of the NHL standings.

Highlights

After taking over from the fired Randy Sexton as General Manager, on December 6, 1995, Pierre Gauthier made three moves to strengthen the club. He hired Jacques Martin as head coach, signed hold-out Alexei Yashin to a contract and engineered a blockbuster trade on January 23, 1996, dealing away Don Beaupre, Martin Straka, and Bryan Berard, while acquiring Damian Rhodes and Wade Redden. It was a three-way trade between the Senators, the Toronto Maple Leafs, and the New York Islanders and was necessary because Berard, the Senators' first-round pick, was refusing to report to the Senators.

The Senators left the Ottawa Civic Centre and played their first game in The Palladium on January 17, 1996, against the Montreal Canadiens. The raising of the Senators' Stanley Cup banners failed, leaving the banners obscuring some fans' view of the scoreboard. The Senators lost 3–0 to the Canadiens.

On April 13, 1996, the Senators played the defending Stanley Cup champion New Jersey Devils, who must win to clinch the final playoff spot in the Eastern Conference. The Senators played the role of spoiler, defeating New Jersey 5–2, officially eliminating the Devils from post-season play and giving the Tampa Bay Lightning, the team that entered the league the same year as the Senators, its first playoff berth.

Final standings

Schedule and results

Player statistics

Regular season
Scoring

Goaltending

Awards and records
 Calder Memorial Trophy, All-Rookie team - Daniel Alfredsson
 Molson Cup - Damian Rhodes
 NHL All-Star Game selection - Daniel Alfredsson

Transactions

Trades

Waivers

Source:

Free agents

Draft picks
Ottawa's draft picks at the 1995 NHL Entry Draft in Edmonton, Alberta.

Farm teams
 Prince Edward Island Senators (American Hockey League)
 Thunder Bay Senators (Colonial Hockey League)

See also
1995–96 NHL season

Notes

References

 
 
 

Ottawa Senators seasons
Ottawa Senators season, 1995-96
Ottawa